Sri Ramakrishna College of Arts and Science for Women is a college in Siddhapudur, Coimbatore, Tamil Nadu, India. It was founded by Sevaratna Dr.R.Venkatesalu for women empowerment. Science and Arts courses offered include BSc (Bachelor of Science), BCA (Bachelor of Computer Application), MSc (Master of Science) It also offers arts courses such as B.Com. and the college is affiliated to Bharathiar University.

History
The Arts and Science was founded in 1991 by Sevaratna Dr.R.Venkatesalu. It belongs to SNR and sons trust. Sevaratna Dr.R.Venkatesalu was the Managing Trustee of the SNR Sons Charitable Trust

Courses Offered
Undergraduate
 B.A. - English literature
 B.Sc. - Computer Science
 B.Sc. - Biochemistry
 B.Sc. - Microbiology
 B.Com.
 B.B.M
 B.C.A
 B.Com. - (C.A)
 B.B.M - (C.A)

PG courses

 M.Sc. - Computer Science
 M.Com. - (CA)
 M.Sc. - Biochemistry
 M.Sc. - Microbiology

Research courses

 M.Phil. - Computer Science (full time and part time)
 M.Phil. - Microbiology (full time and part time)
 M.Phil. - Commerce (full time and part time)
 M.Phil. - Bioinformatics (full time and part time)

Facilities
 Hostel
 Library
 Internet

References

External links

Women's universities and colleges in Tamil Nadu
Universities and colleges in Coimbatore
Educational institutions established in 1991
1991 establishments in Tamil Nadu